The 2014 Bank of America 500 was a NASCAR Sprint Cup Series stock car race that was held on October 11, 2014, at Charlotte Motor Speedway in Concord, North Carolina. Contested over 334 laps on the 1.5-mile (2.4 km) asphalt quad-oval, it was the 31st race of the 2014 Sprint Cup Series season, as well as the fifth race of ten in the Chase for the Sprint Cup. It was also ABC's final NASCAR telecast for the foreseeable future. Kevin Harvick scored his third win of the season and first since Darlington in April. Jeff Gordon finished second for the sixth time this season. Jamie McMurray, Joey Logano, and Kyle Busch rounded out the top five. The top rookies of the race were Kyle Larson (6th), Austin Dillon (13th), and Justin Allgaier (15th).

Previous week's race
On the final restart with 28 laps to go, Ryan Newman lost the lead to Joey Logano and he held off a hard-charging Kyle Larson to score his fifth win of the season. “It was a crazy race, and I had such a fast Pennzoil Ford," said Logano. It is awesome to be back in victory lane. When the top opened up, the car just took off. Me and the No. 42 (Kyle Larson) were the only ones that seemed to be able to run up there. We had a cat and mouse (with Larson) during portions of the late run. I just had to be able to work the traffic and keep my momentum up. We just have to keep capitalizing going forward.”

Report

Background
The race was held at Charlotte Motor Speedway, a motorsports complex located in Concord, North Carolina, United States, 13 miles from Charlotte, North Carolina. The complex features a  quad-oval track that hosts NASCAR racing including the prestigious Coca-Cola 600 on Memorial Day weekend and the Sprint All-Star Race, as well as the Bank of America 500. The speedway was built in 1959 by Bruton Smith and is considered the home track for NASCAR with many race teams located in the Charlotte area. The track is owned and operated by Speedway Motorsports (SMI) with Marcus G. Smith (son of Bruton Smith) as track president.

Practice and qualifying
You just got to pick through it all.’’ "Oh my gosh, it's so fast, so much grip, so much commitment," Jeff Gordon said after qualifying second. "… That's a great place to start this race." Jimmie Johnson, who enters the race twelfth in points, qualified 21st. “Just didn’t have the speed on that final run, I got pretty tight off of (Turn) 4,’’ Johnson said. “I thought we had some hope after the first round. Our second outing we ran a very good lap and just didn’t have any more there on that lap through Turns 3 and 4, got wide and had to let off (the accelerator) a little bit so I didn’t get into the outside wall. Disappointing. No way around it.’’ Trevor Bayne failed to qualify for the race. Jimmie Johnson tagged the wall in the closing minutes of the session. The damage wasn't enough to warrant rolling out the backup car. “The car’s really fast,” Johnson said. “We were feeling really good about things. The good news is that it’s just a big scratch. Just a little drama.”

Race

First half

Start

Prior to the start of the race, Matt Kenseth had to drop to the rear of the field for unapproved adjustments.

The race started at 7:54 p.m. Kyle Busch led early in the race, though Jeff Gordon took the lead on lap 14. The first of eight cautions in the race flew on lap 26. It was a planned competition caution. Following the caution, Dale Earnhardt Jr. won the race off pit road to assume the lead. Earnhardt Jr. led the restart on lap 31, and promptly lost the lead to Kyle Busch.

The second caution of the race flew on lap 96 when Clint Bowyer blew an engine exiting turn 4. Dale Earnhardt Jr. took just two tires, and exited as the leader. Following the restart on lap 101, Jamie McMurray took the lead.  Kevin Harvick then took the lead on lap 105.

Paul Menard brought out the third caution on lap 136 after blowing an engine on the backstretch. Describing the incident, Menard said, “Something with the motor. I had a really good car. It’s too bad, awesome car; we had a pit stop problem and went to the back, but drove our way back up into the top 15 or so.”

Earnhardt Jr. pitted while the pits were closed to fix a broken shifter. This was similar to what happened to his teammate Jimmie Johnson at Michigan two months prior. Harvick and Gordon traded the lead on the pit road, with Harvick winning the race off.

The fourth caution of the race flew on lap 221 after Josh Wise blew an engine.  The race restarted on lap 227.  The fifth caution of the race flew with 98 laps to go after Brian Vickers got loose and spun in turn 4. Austin Dillon stayed out when the leaders pitted and took over the lead.  The race restarted with 92 laps to go, and Kyle Busch retook the lead.

The sixth caution of the race flew with 89 laps to go after Joey Logano tapped the left-rear corner panel of Danica Patrick, who connected with the wall. Ryan Newman spun to avoid hitting her.  The race restarted with 82 laps to go, and Kyle Larson took the lead with 71 laps to go.

The seventh caution flew with 68 laps to go when Michael Annett was slowing with a flat left-rear tire. Brad Keselowski stayed out when the leaders pitted and assumed the lead. The race restarted with 63 laps to go, and Denny Hamlin promptly took the lead. Kevin Harvick retook the lead with 41 laps to go.

Second half
In the final 25 laps of the race, a number of lead changes occurred. Kevin Harvick made his final stop with 23 laps to go and handed the lead to Jeff Gordon. Gordon made his final stop with 22 laps to go and handed the lead to Kurt Busch, who in turn made his final stop with 21 laps to go, handing the lead to Austin Dillon. Dillon made his final stop with 20 laps to go, with Ryan Newman assuming the lead.  Newman made his final stop with 19 laps to go and Carl Edwards took the lead. Edwards made his final stop with 18 laps to go and handed the lead to Justin Allgaier. Allgaier made his final stop with 16 laps to go and the lead cycled back to Kevin Harvick.

The eighth caution of the race flew with seven laps to go, after Brian Vickers blew an engine. The race restarted with two laps to go and Harvick shot ahead of Jeff Gordon to win the race. “Oh, we came here and tested thinking that this was going to be the hardest round to get through because of Talladega,” Harvick said. “There’s so much that you can’t control there. We wanted to try to control the things that we could control. We felt like Kansas and here (Charlotte) were playing to our strengths; and just see where it fell after that once we get to the next round. So I’m really proud of everybody at SHR. I’m really proud of all my guys on this team. I just can’t thank everybody enough.” "I'm really proud of that finish, really proud of that effort," Gordon said. " ... Kevin was tough. I knew he was going to be tough once he got out there."

Post race conflict
Keselowski and Hamlin were angry with one another on the cool-down lap. Keselowski made contact with Matt Kenseth on pit road, while Matt had his seatbelt unbuckled and inadvertently rear-ended Tony Stewart, who then backed into the 2 car. In the garage area, Hamlin continued to confront Keselowski by throwing a towel at him before NASCAR officials and crew members escorted Hamlin to the team trailer. While Keselowski was walking to his hauler, he was attacked from behind by Kenseth with Kenseth saying something like "you drove into me and wrecked me after the race" with Keselowski responding to Kenseth "you hit me under yellow" three times until he was pulled out by Keselowski's crew chef Paul Wolfe. “When the last yellow came out, he got the wave around and when he came by, he swung by my car and tore the whole right front off of it,’’ Keselowski said of Kenseth. "We restarted fifth with no right front on it and fell back to 16th and ruined our day. For some reason after the race (Hamlin) stopped in front of me and tried to pick a fight. I don’t know what that was about. He swung and hit at my car. I figure if we’re  going to play car wars under the yellow and after the race, I’m going to play, too. Those guys can dish it out and they can’t take it. I gave it back to them and they want to fight." "(Brad Keselowski) was doing something with Denny (Hamlin), I don't know," Kenseth said. "The race had ended and he's running into cars on the cool down lap. I mean, the race is over and he comes down pit road and drives into the side of me - that's inexcusable. He's a champion and he's supposed to know better." "When you see Matt Kenseth mad enough to fight, you know that this is intense because that's way out of character for him," Harvick said. "Every moment matters in this Chase, and Matt Kenseth knew that that one particular moment could have been the end of his Chase."

Post-race penalties
On Tuesday, October 14, NASCAR handed down penalties regarding the events following the race. Brad Keselowski was fined $50,000 and placed on NASCAR probation for the next four Sprint Cup Series championship events through November 12 for violating:

 Section 12-1: Actions detrimental to stock car racing

 Section 12-4.9: Behavioral penalty—involved in post-race incidents

Tony Stewart was also fined $25,000 and placed on NASCAR probation for the next four Cup Series races through November 12 for the same charges.

"These penalties are about maintaining a safe environment following the race," said Robin Pemberton, NASCAR senior vice president, competition and racing development. "We knew that the new Chase format was likely going to raise the intensity level and we want our drivers to continue to be themselves. However, the safety of our drivers, crew members, officials, and workers is paramount and we will react when that safety could be compromised."

Race statistics
 32 lead changes among different drivers
 8 cautions for 39 laps
 Time of race: 3 hours, 26 minutes and 49 seconds
 Average speed: 
 Kevin Harvick took home $301.468 in winnings in his third win of the year.

Results

Qualifying

Race results

Standings after the race

Drivers' Championship standings

Manufacturers' Championship standings

Note: Only the first sixteen positions are included for the driver standings.

Note

References

Bank of America 500
Bank of America 500
Bank of America 500
NASCAR races at Charlotte Motor Speedway